Mark Semenovich Rakita (born July 22, 1938) is a famed Russian two-time Olympic champion sabreur and coach from the Soviet era.

Early life
Rakita was born in Moscow, USSR, and is Jewish.

Fencing career
Rakita started fencing when he was 14.  He would practice for three to six hours per day.  A 1969 graduate of The Daghestan State Pedagogical Institute, Rakita earned the title of Master of the Sport (Fencing) in 1964.  He trained at the Armed Forces sports society. He trained under Olympian David Tishler.

World championships
Rakita was one of the Soviet Union's top sabre fencers in the 1960s. As a member of the Soviet National team, he won the world championship in the team sabre in 1965, 1967, 1969, and 1971. He won bronze medals with the team in 1962 and 1963.

Rakita was also the world champion in individual sabre in 1967, and finished second in 1971.

Olympics
Rakita participated in three Olympic Games. At the 1964 Summer Olympics, he won a gold medal in team sabre and competed in the individual event. At the 1968 Summer Olympics, he won a silver medal in the individual event and won gold in the team event. At the 1972 Summer Olympics, he competed in the team event, and won a silver medal.

World championships
 1967 Individual Sabre (Gold)
 1967 Team Sabre (Gold)
 1971 Individual Sabre (Silver)

Coaching career
Rakita coached the Russian fencing team for 17 years, and four of his students won Olympic medals.

At the 2001 Maccabiah Games, Rakita coached Sergei Sharikov and Maria Mazina to gold medals.

In 2004, he was honorary president of Maccabi Russia.

Hall of Fame

In 1988 Rakita, who is Jewish, was inducted into the International Jewish Sports Hall of Fame.

Feud 
In an interview in New York, Mark Rakita discussed his long-time feud with former friend/teammate turned nemesis Vladimir Nazlymov, stating, "As far as I'm concerned, he no longer exists!"

See also
List of select Jewish fencers

References

External links
Jewish Sports bio
Jewish Sports Legends bio
International Jewish Hall of Fame bio
"A Jewish Sporting Legend, 10/18/06

1938 births
Living people
Russian male sabre fencers
Soviet male sabre fencers
Jewish Russian sportspeople
Jewish male sabre fencers
Olympic fencers of the Soviet Union
Fencers at the 1964 Summer Olympics
Fencers at the 1968 Summer Olympics
Fencers at the 1972 Summer Olympics
Olympic gold medalists for the Soviet Union
Olympic silver medalists for the Soviet Union
Olympic medalists in fencing
Sportspeople from Moscow
Soviet Jews
International Jewish Sports Hall of Fame inductees
Medalists at the 1964 Summer Olympics
Medalists at the 1968 Summer Olympics
Medalists at the 1972 Summer Olympics